The Hastings Deering Colts is a junior rugby league competition based in Queensland, contested among teams made up of players aged 21 or under. The competition is administered by the Queensland Rugby League (QRL), and is contested by fourteen teams, thirteen of which are located in Queensland and one in New South Wales.

From 2018 to 2020, the Hastings Deering Colts was an under-20 competition before moving to an under-21 format for the 2021 season.

History
Before the advent of the Hastings Deering Colts, there had been no statewide, full season under-20 competition in Queensland. The FOGS Colts Challenge, which ran from 1986 to 2017, only featured sides from South East Queensland. From 2008 to 2017, the National Rugby League (NRL) administered their own under-20 competition, the National Youth Competition (NYC), which featured the three Queensland-based NRL clubs, the Brisbane Broncos, Gold Coast Titans and North Queensland Cowboys, and a plethora of young players from the state.

In 2016, the NRL announced that the National Youth Competition would be discontinued after the 2017 season, in favour of state-based under-20 competitions, administered by the Queensland Rugby League (QRL) and New South Wales Rugby League (NSWRL).

In 2017, in preparation for the new competition, the QRL ran a shortened, statewide under-20 competition called the FOGS U20s Cup. The competition, which was won by the Redcliffe Dolphins, ran over nine-weeks, alongside the Mal Meninga Cup, and featured all 15 teams who would eventually participate in the Hastings Deering Colts.

On 12 October 2017, the QRL announced the Hastings Deering Colts as the state's under-20 competition, running alongside the senior Queensland Cup competition, with 13 Queensland Cup sides fielding a team in the inaugural season. On 9 October 2018, the Victoria Thunderbolts left the competition after one season to return to the NSWRL setup, joining the Jersey Flegg Cup.

On 17 March 2020, two days after the completion of Round One, the QRL announced a 10-week suspension of the competition until 5 June, due to the COVID-19 pandemic. On 27 March, ten days after the suspension, the QRL confirmed the cancellation of the competition for the 2020 season.

On 19 October 2020, the QRL announced that the competition would return in 2021 and would be played under an under-21 format.

Hastings Deering Colts teams

The Hastings Deering Colts consists of 14 teams, 13 from Queensland, and 1 from New South Wales., and operates on a single group system, with no divisions or conferences and no relegation and promotion from other leagues.Much like the Queensland Cup, each club in the competition has an affiliation with a team in the NRL.

Current teams

Season structure

Regular season
The Hastings Deering Colts follows the same regular season format as the Queensland Cup, with games usually played as curtain-raisers to the senior fixtures. Beginning in early March, a round of regular season games is then played almost every weekend for twenty-three weeks, ending in early September. Unlike the Queensland Cup, the Hastings Deering Colts features three full rounds where every team receives a bye and a split round in Round 19. These rounds are scheduled in to accommodate university exam periods.

Teams receive two competition points for a win, and one point for a draw. The bye also receives two points; a loss, no points. Teams on the ladder are ranked by competition points, then match points differential (for and against) and points percentage are used to separate teams with equal competition points. At the end of the regular season, the club which is ranked highest on the ladder is declared minor premiers.

Finals series
After using a top six final series system in 2018, the competition followed the Queensland Cup in adopting a top eight final series for the 2019 season. The eight finalists are split into two groups for the opening week of the finals series. The top four teams have the best chance of winning the premiership and play the two Qualifying Finals. The winners get a bye through to Week Three of the finals to play home Preliminary Finals, while the losers play home Semi-Finals in Week Two. The bottom four teams play the two Elimination Finals, where the winners advance to Week Two away games and the losers' seasons are over.

The winners of two Preliminary Finals then contest the Grand Final, which is played in late September as a curtain-raiser to the Queensland Cup Grand Final.

Grand Final results

Awards

Player of the Year
2018: Shannon Gardiner (Wynnum-Manly Seagulls)
2019: Tom McGrath (Northern Pride)
2020: Not awarded
2021: Cruise Ten (Souths Logan Magpies)
2022: Jonah Glover (Brisbane Tigers)

See also

 Jersey Flegg Cup
 Queensland Cup
 Mal Meninga Cup
 FOGS Colts Challenge
 Queensland Rugby League

References

External links

Queensland Cup
Rugby league competitions in Queensland
Recurring sporting events established in 2018
2018 establishments in Australia
Sports leagues established in 2018
Junior rugby league
NRL Under-20s